John Edward Faszholz (April 11, 1927 – March 25, 2017), nicknamed Preacher, was an American Major League Baseball pitcher who played for the St. Louis Cardinals in its 1953 season.

Career and Education 
He went to spring training with the Cardinals in 1953 and 1955, and pitched a total of 11⅔ innings at the National League level.

However, most of his baseball career was spent playing for the Rochester Red Wings in Rochester, NY. At the time the Red Wings were a minor league affiliate of the Cardinals.

Faszholz was inducted into the Red Wings Hall of Fame in 1990, winning more games than any other pitcher in franchise history with 80 career victories.

While playing professional baseball, he also attended Concordia Seminary in St. Louis, Missouri, during the fall semester of each year, beginning in 1947 and finally graduating in 1958. He then became an ordained pastor of the Lutheran Church–Missouri Synod and taught first at Lutheran high schools in St. Louis, then at Concordia University in Austin, Texas.

Death 
Faszholz died in 2017 in Belle, Missouri, at the age of 89.

References

External links

SABR Biography Project

1927 births
2017 deaths
Baseball players from St. Louis
Columbus Red Birds players
Major League Baseball pitchers
Roanoke Red Sox players
Rochester Red Wings players
Scranton Red Sox players
St. Louis Cardinals players
20th-century American Lutheran clergy
Lutheran Church–Missouri Synod people
Concordia Seminary alumni